Artemisia of Caria may refer to:

 Artemisia I of Caria (fl. 480 BC), queen of Halicarnassus under the First Persian Empire, naval commander during the second Persian invasion of Greece
 Artemisia II of Caria (died 350 BC), queen of Caria under the First Persian Empire, ordered the construction of the Mausoleum at Halicarnassus